The 1883 Grand National was the 45th renewal of the Grand National horse race that took place at Aintree near Liverpool, England, on 30 March 1883.
With only 10 starters, it was the smallest Grand National field in history (excluding the precursors of 1836–8).

Finishing Order

Non-finishers

References

 1883
Grand National
Grand National
19th century in Lancashire